Psalm 93 is the 93rd psalm of the Book of Psalms, beginning in English in the King James Version: "The LORD reigneth, he is clothed with majesty". The Latin wording is Dominus regnavit, decorem indutus est. The Book of Psalms is part of the Hebrew Bible and the Christian Old Testament. In the slightly different numbering system of the Greek Septuagint and Latin Vulgate versions of the Bible, this psalm is Psalm 92.  It is the first of a series of psalms (Psalms 93–99) which are called royal psalms as they praise God as King.

In the Masoretic text and in English versions it has no title or author, but the Septuagint and Vulgate entitle it "On the day before the Sabbath, when the earth was founded: A Psalm of thanksgiving to (or for) David".

The psalm forms a regular part of Jewish, Catholic, Lutheran, Anglican and other Protestant worship. It has often been set to music. The Latin version was set by Hildegard of Bingen, Josquin des Prez, Jean-Joseph de Mondonville and Jules Van Nuffel, among others. Heinrich Schütz and Ferdinand Hiller composed settings in German. Handel used verses from the psalm for his Chandos Anthem No. 4 for use in the Anglican Church.

Background and themes
The two main themes of Psalm 93 are God's kingship and a connection with Friday, the sixth day of the week (counting from Sunday). The Zohar notes that in Hebrew, this psalm contains 45 words, which is the gematria (numerical value) of the word adam ("man"). Adam was created on the sixth day of Creation and went on to proclaim God as King. Psalm 93 was also designated as the Song of the Day for Friday, to be sung by the Levites in the Temple in Jerusalem: this tradition continues today in the psalm's inclusion in the regular Friday morning prayer service in Judaism. According to Rabbi Yaakov Emden, the connection with the sixth day is reinforced by the psalm's description of God "in His full grandeur and power as He was when He completed the six days of Creation", and the reference to donning grandeur further alludes to the way Jews dress up in their nicest garments on Friday to greet the approaching Shabbat. Psalm 93 also hints to the future Messianic Age, when the entire world will acknowledge God as King.

Charles Spurgeon notes that the Septuagint connects Psalm 93 with the sixth day of the week by titling it "On the day before the Sabbath, when the earth was founded: A Psalm of thanksgiving to (or for) David". This wording was similarly adopted by the Vulgate: Psalmus ipsi David, quarta sabbati. Spurgeon adds that the theme of God's sovereignty is clear from the first line of the psalm. Matthew Henry notes how the psalm reinforces God's kingship by comparing him to earthly kings, stating:
Concerning God's kingdom glorious things are here spoken.I. Have other kings their royal robes? So has he (v. 1).II. Have they their thrones? So has he (v. 2).III. Have they their enemies whom they subdue and triumph over? So has he (v. 3, v. 4).IV. Is it their honour to be faithful and holy? So it is his (v. 5).

Text

Hebrew Bible version
Following is the Hebrew text of Psalm 93:

King James Version
 The  reigneth, he is clothed with majesty; the LORD is clothed with strength, wherewith he hath girded himself: the world also is established, that it cannot be moved. 
 Thy throne is established of old: thou art from everlasting. 
 The floods have lifted up, O , the floods have lifted up their voice; the floods lift up their waves. 
 The  on high is mightier than the noise of many waters, yea, than the mighty waves of the sea. 
 Thy testimonies are very sure: holiness becometh thine house, O , for ever.

Textual witnesses
Some early manuscripts containing the text of this chapter in Hebrew are of the Masoretic Text tradition, which includes the Aleppo Codex (10th century), and Codex Leningradensis (1008).

The extant palimpsest Aq includes a translation into Koine Greek by Aquila of Sinope in c. 130 CE, containing verse 3.

Uses

Judaism
Psalm 93 is the Song of the Day for Friday, recited in that day's morning prayer service. Some communities also recite this psalm as the ma'amad (special daily prayer) for Friday. Additionally, Psalm 93 is the final psalm said during the Kabbalat Shabbat service on Friday night, acting as a summation of the preceding seven psalms. It is also recited in its entirety during Pesukei dezimra on Shabbat, Yom Tov, and - in many communities - on Hoshana Rabbah. In most Sephardic communities, it is recited in mincha on Friday as well.

Verse 1 (in the Hebrew) is quoted in Mishnah Tamid 7:4.
Verse 1 is also one of the ten verses in the section of Malkhuyot (Sovereignty) which is recited in the Mussaf Amidah on Rosh Hashanah.

Verse 4 (in the Hebrew) is said by the seas in Perek Shirah.

Psalm 93 is said as a prayer for success in a court case.

Musical settings

Catholic 
"Dominus regnavit" is Psalm 92 in the Vulgate; it was set by Hildegard of Bingen. A motet setting it for choir a cappella, with an added doxology, is attributed to Josquin des Prez.

Jean-Joseph de Mondonville set the psalm in 1734 as a Grand Motet in several movements, Dominus regnavit decorum. Jules Van Nuffel, founder and conductor of the choir at St. Rumbold's Cathedral in Mechelen, Belgium, set the psalm in Latin, Dominus regnavit, for four-to-six-part choir and organ, Op. 49, in 1935.

Protestant 
The Lutheran Baroque composer Heinrich Schütz set Psalm 93 in German, "Der Herr ist König herrlich schön" (The Lord is King, heavenly beautiful), for choir as part of his composition of the Becker Psalter, SWV 191. Handel used verses from the psalm for his Chandos Anthem No. 4 in 1717 or 1718, intended for use in the Anglican Church.

Ferdinand Hiller wrote a setting in German for men's choir and orchestra, published in Leipzig, 1864.

In the Free Church of Scotland's 2003 psalter, Sing Psalms, Psalm 93 starts "The Lord is king; his throne endures." Set to the common meter, the recommended melodies are St. Magnus, Southwark and Stroudwater.

Jewish
Shlomo Carlebach composed a melody for the last two verses in the Hebrew, to be sung during Kabbalat Shabbat. Charles Salaman arranged a setting based on Mendelssohn's Elijah that is sung in the Friday night shabbat service in London's Spanish and Portuguese synagogue.

References

Cited sources

External links

 
 
 Text of Psalm 93 according to the 1928 Psalter
 Psalms Chapter 93 text in Hebrew and English, mechon-mamre.org
 The LORD is king, robed with majesty; text and footnotes, usccb.org United States Conference of Catholic Bishops
 Psalm 93:1 introduction and text, biblestudytools.com
 Psalm 93 – The LORD Reigns enduringword.com
 Psalm 93 / Refrain: The Lord shall reign for ever and ever. Church of England
 Psalm 93 at biblegateway.com

093
Shacharit for Shabbat and Yom Tov